Taham (also Romanized as Tahām) is a village in Kisom Rural District, in the Central District of Astaneh-ye Ashrafiyeh County, Gilan Province, Iran. At the 2006 census, its population was 179, in 53 families.

References 

Populated places in Astaneh-ye Ashrafiyeh County